Charley Ellis (January 12, 1944 – August 29, 2018) was an American boxer. He competed in the men's light welterweight event at the 1964 Summer Olympics. At the 1964 Summer Olympics, he defeated Heiko Winter of the United Team of Germany, before losing to Yevgeny Frolov of the Soviet Union.

References

External links
 

1944 births
2018 deaths
American male boxers
Olympic boxers of the United States
Boxers at the 1964 Summer Olympics
Boxers from Louisville, Kentucky
Light-welterweight boxers